General elections were held in Thailand on 26 February 1957. The result was a victory for the Seri Manangkhasila Party, which won 86 of the 160 elected seats, with the 123 appointed members of the previous parliament continued to serve in the newly elected one. Voter turnout was 57.5%, significantly higher than previous elections (the previous record had been 41.5% in 1933), which was an indicator of heavy fraud.

Results

Results by province

References 

1957 02
Thailand
1957 elections in Thailand
1957